Shambleau and Others is a 1953 collection of science fiction and fantasy short stories by American writer C. L. Moore.  The book was originally announced by Arkham House but never published by them.  It was first published by Gnome Press in 1953 in an edition of 4,000 copies.  The collections contains stories about Moore's characters Northwest Smith and Jirel of Joiry.  The stories all originally appeared in the magazine Weird Tales.

Contents

 "Black God’s Kiss"
 "Shambleau"
 "Black God’s Shadow"
 "Black Thirst"
 "The Tree of Life"
 "Jirel Meets Magic"
 "Scarlet Dream"

References

Sources

1953 short story collections
Science fiction short story collections
Fantasy short story collections
Gnome Press books